Upton Castle is a 13th-century castle or fortified manor house with an associated chapel, located near Cosheston, Pembrokeshire in Wales. Although in private ownership, the gardens are open to the public. They are listed on the Cadw/ICOMOS Register of Parks and Gardens of Special Historic Interest in Wales.

History
Upton Castle is believed to have been built in the 13th century and stands close to a creek of the River Cleddau on land held by the Earls of Pembroke. The original holders were the Norman Malefaunt family, in whose hands it remained until the 16th century when it passed to the Bowen family. In the late 18th century, the house and estate was sold to John Tasker, although Nicholas Carlisle described the building in 1811 as "now in ruins". Between 1828 and 1860 there were considerable alterations to the building, including the insertion of a new door and the construction of two large wings. In January 1883 there was a fire at the castle, attended by a fire crew from the 23rd Regiment, Royal Welsh Fusiliers. The owner at the time was Mr H. H. Vaughan. The damage was confined to timbers, walls and chimney-piece.

Management of the gardens, which had been substantially improved in the early 20th century, was taken over by the Pembrokeshire Coast National Park and opened to the public in 1976. However, the park authority later withdrew their funding and since the property changed hands in 2007, the new owners and a team of volunteers have restored and reopened the gardens. In the summer of 2012, the castle was investigated by a team of archaeologists from the Channel 4 television series Time Team, which confirmed that the chapel pre-dated the castle.

Description
Too small to be described as castle in the strict sense of the word, most sources refer to it as a "fortified mansion" although its towers are unusually strong in comparison with other examples. The medieval portion of the exterior stands to the north east of the range, which is dominated by three early towers, separated by short sections of  curtain wall and surmounted by a plain parapet on corbels. Surviving internal medieval features include two fireplaces, a spiral staircase and a vaulted ceiling. It is a Grade II listed building. The gardens are designated Grade II on the Cadw/ICOMOS Register of Parks and Gardens of Special Historic Interest in Wales.

Upton Chapel

Close to the castle is Upton Chapel dedicated to Saint Giles. Dated to the 12th or 13th century, it consists of a small nave and chancel. Amongst the various memorials in the chapel are the effigies of William Malefant (died in 1362) wearing chain mail and another of a female member of the Malefant family. The interior was restored in 1978 by the owner of the castle. It is a Grade I listed building.

References

Castles in Pembrokeshire
Grade II listed buildings in Pembrokeshire
Grade II listed castles in Wales
Registered historic parks and gardens in Pembrokeshire